Thijs Dallinga (born 3 August 2000) is a Dutch professional footballer who plays as a striker for  club Toulouse and the Netherlands national under-21 team.

Dallinga emerged as a talent of Emmen and signed with Groningen in 2018. His breakthrough came after moving to Excelsior as a free agent in 2021, scoring an unprecedented 36 goals in 43 appearances in the 2021–22 Eerste Divisie season and subsequent playoffs, to help the club win promotion to the Eredivisie.

A Dutch youth international, Dallinga has gained caps for both the Netherlands under-19 and Netherlands under-21 team.

Club career

Emmen
Dallinga was born in Groningen and grew up in the towns of Siddeburen and Hellum. He played youth football for VV Siddeburen and VV Hoogezand, until he joined the youth academy of FC Emmen in 2012.

He progressed through the youth teams of Emmen before making his professional debut on 27 November 2017 in a 2–1 victory over MVV in the Eerste Divisie, coming on as a substitute in the 83rd minute for Cas Peters. On 9 April 2018, he scored his first senior goal in a league match against Telstar. In his debut season, Emmen managed to win promotion to the Eredivisie via the play-offs, in which Dallinga did not make an appearance.

Groningen
On 28 June 2018, Dallinga signed a three-year contract with Groningen, and would initially join their reserve team competing in the Derde Divisie. After the reserve team withdrew from competition, Dallinga was one of the few players that would stay with the club. He was subsequently promoted to the first team.

On 12 December 2020, Dallinga made his debut for Groningen in the Eredivisie, coming off the bench in the 74th minute for Jørgen Strand Larsen in a 2–0 victory against RKC Waalwijk.

After the 2020–21 season, Dallinga chose to not extend his expiring contract in order for him to gain more experience elsewhere.

Excelsior
In May 2021, Dallinga signed for Excelsior on a free transfer, penning a contract for two seasons. He immediately became a starter in manager Marinus Dijkhuizen's team. On 6 August 2021, He made his debut in the 1–0 home loss to TOP Oss. On 13 August, he scored his first goal for Excelsior in a 2–1 away win over Roda JC Kerkrade. Three weeks later, on 3 September, Dallinga impressed by scoring four goals in the 5–0 away win over FC Den Bosch. On 25 September, he scored a brace against Jong PSV in a 3–0 win, bringing his tally to nine goals in eight league games. In the first 19 games for the club, he scored 24 goals and was on pace to break the goal record in the Eerste Divisie.

Dallinga would also prove decisive in the playoffs for promotion after Excelsior qualified by finishing sixth in the league table. He scored four goals in their six matches en route to Eredivisie promotion, including a crucial 3–3 equaliser in injury time of the final playoff tie against ADO Den Haag on 29 May 2022. This happened after having missed a penalty kick earlier in the game. With 36 goals from Dallinga that season, Excelsior achieved promotion after a penalty shoot-out.

Toulouse
On 1 July 2022, Dallinga signed with Toulouse in France. He made his competitive debut on the opening day of the 2022–23 Ligue 1, immediately scoring his first goal for the club after being assisted by compatriot Branco van den Boomen in a 1–1 home draw against Nice.

International career
In 2018, Dallinga was called up by Netherlands under-19 coach Maarten Stekelenburg for three friendly matches. He made his debut on 14 November 2018 in a 4–0 win over Armenia. On 20 November 2018, he scored the winning goal in the 2–1 victory over Portugal just eight minutes after coming off the bench.

On 22 October 2021, Dallinga received his first call up for the Netherlands under-21s but would only go on to make his debut on 23 September 2022 in a 2–1 victory over Belgium at Den Dreef in a friendly.

Career statistics

Honours
Individual
 Eerste Divisie top scorer: 2021–22

References

External links
 
 
 

2000 births
Living people
Dutch footballers
Footballers from Groningen (city)
Association football forwards
FC Emmen players
FC Groningen players
Excelsior Rotterdam players
Toulouse FC players
Eerste Divisie players
Derde Divisie players
Ligue 1 players
Netherlands youth international footballers
Netherlands under-21 international footballers
Dutch expatriate footballers
Expatriate footballers in France
Dutch expatriate sportspeople in France
21st-century Dutch people